Gus's cafe is a cafe located in Civic, Canberra, Australia. It opened in 1969 and later became the first outdoor pavement cafe in Canberra. It is one of the oldest and best known cafes in Canberra and one of the first European-style cafes in Australia.  It has both outdoor and indoor dining areas.

The cafe was established by Augustin 'Gus' Petersilka (20 July 1918 – 23 October 1994) who emigrated to Australia from Austria in 1951 and arrived in Canberra in 1962. Petersilka had difficulties with introducing this new style of dining to Canberra as it was against the regulations of the time for people to sit outside in a cafe or restaurant, and he had several well-publicised clashes with bureaucrats.

A plaque on the pavement outside Gus's cafe marks the occasion of Gus Petersilka being made the Canberran of the Year for 1978. It reads:

Petersilka was commemorated on 14 November 2002, by having a street named after him in the Canberra district of Gungahlin. The cafe was heritage listed in 2011.

On 11 March 2011, Gus's was added to the Australian Capital Territory Heritage Register.

On 9 March 2012, Gus's was temporarily closed down by the ACT Health Directorate for serious food safety breaches and risks to the public.

The cafe closed in late June 2016 and was sold. It re-opened in September 2017 as Gus' Place.

References 

Australian Capital Territory Heritage Register
Bakery cafés
Buildings and structures in Canberra
Coffeehouses and cafés in Australia
Restaurants in Canberra